Eric Andrés Ahumada Escobar (born 14 February 1994) is a Chilean footballer currently playing for Cobreloa of the Primera B de Chile.

External links
 
 

1994 births
Living people
Chilean footballers
Cobreloa footballers
C.D. Huachipato footballers
Deportes Magallanes footballers
Deportes Iberia footballers
Chilean Primera División players
Primera B de Chile players
Association football defenders